Tommotiids are an extinct group of Cambrian invertebrates thought to be early lophophorates (the group containing Bryozoa, Brachiopoda, and Phoronida).

The majority of tommotiids are mineralised with calcium phosphate rather than calcium carbonate. although silicified examples hint that some species bore carbonate or carbonaceous sclerites.

Micrina and Paterimitra possess bivalved shells in their larval phases, which preserve characters that might position them in the Linguliformea and Rhynchonelliformea stem lineages respectively. This would indicate that the brachiopod shell represents the retention of a larval character.

For a long part of their history, the tommotiids were only known from disarticulated shells - a complete organism had not been found.  The 2008 discovery of Eccentrotheca offered the first insight into a complete organism, and permitted a reconstruction of the animal as a sessile, tube-like animal made up of a spiral of overlapping plates. Articulated specimens of Paterimitra, discovered a year later, suggest a similar form and lifestyle - it is possible that many tommotiids need redescribing as sessile tube-dwellers.

However, the discovery of the articulated camenellan Wufengella showed that it was a free-living worm-like animal, suggesting that it was not a crown-group lophophorate, as the last living common ancestor of all living lophophorates has been predicted to be sessile, as bryozoans, brachiopods and phoronids are. This indicates that tomotiids are paraphyletic, with some tomotiids more closely related to bryozoans, brachiopods and phoronids than to other tomotiids.

These discoveries have produced an alternative model for the origin of the brachiopods; it suggested that they evolved by the reduction of sessile tube-like organisms, until only two shells were left. This contrasts with the brachiopod fold hypothesis which suggests that they formed by the folding of a halkieriid-like organism.

Taxonomy 
Five families are recognized:

References

Cambrian invertebrates
Lophophorata